Ben Cooper (born February 24, 1982) is a singer-songwriter from Jacksonville, Florida. He is currently a member of Electric President with Alex Kane, Radical Face (formerly known as Radical Face Versus Phalex Sledgehammer), Iron Orchestra (alongside his brother), Mother's Basement and Unkle Stiltskin, The Clone Project (with Rick Colado), among other musical projects. Cooper is best known for his 2007 track "Welcome Home".

Cooper also owns digital design company The Lazy Eye.

Early life 
Ben Cooper was born February 24, 1982, in Jacksonville, Florida, and grew up in a family of nine siblings. His creative streak originated from a passion for drawing and painting early on, and by middle school he had begun making short movies with friends and playing music.

When Ben Cooper was 14, he came out as gay to his parents. His step-father then kicked him out of his home. In his adulthood, Cooper found out that his step-father sexually abused his niece. Ben ended up adopting his niece, and gave testimony at his step-father's trial. Although he intended for his "The Family Tree" trilogy to be fictional when he began the project, his songs in the third album, "Leaves," were directly written about his family due to those recent developments in his life.

At the age of 19, Ben Cooper decided he wanted to become a writer and wrote two books. However, he did not backup his files and the computer crashed, so he took it outside and smashed it with a hammer. It was with this turn of events that Cooper started creating music for himself which would eventually form into an unintended career, despite his original intentions. Most of Cooper's tracks are reportedly recorded in a tool shed outside his house.

Career

Electric President (2003-2010) 
Cooper met Alex Kane in 2000 in a band called Helicopter Project when asked to replace the lead singer of the band, and the two worked together on various projects. After releasing a third album, The Violent Blue with Electric President in 2010, Kane and Cooper began to focus on other projects, with Cooper pursuing work on his "Family Tree" albums under Radical Face.

Radical Face (2003–present) 
Radical Face is perhaps best known for the 2007 track "Welcome Home" which featured on an advertisement for Nikon cameras.

In 2011, Cooper released an album under the alias "Patients".

The song "We're On Our Way" was featured in the trailer for the 2012 motion picture The Perks of Being a Wallflower.

The songs "Glory" and "All is Well (Goodbye, Goodbye)" performed by Radical Face were featured in the 2016 motion picture Buddymoon.

References

American male singer-songwriters
Musicians from Jacksonville, Florida
Living people
1982 births
American gay musicians
American LGBT singers
LGBT people from Florida
Singer-songwriters from Florida
21st-century American singers
21st-century American male singers
20th-century American LGBT people
21st-century American LGBT people